Treaster Run is a  tributary of Honey Creek in Mifflin County, Pennsylvania in the United States.

Treaster Run joins Honey Creek just downstream of the community of Locke Mills.

See also
List of rivers of Pennsylvania

Tributaries
Havice Creek

References

Rivers of Pennsylvania
Tributaries of the Juniata River
Rivers of Mifflin County, Pennsylvania